Thomas Bayne Denègre, Sr. (January 18, 1893June 1967) of New Orleans, Louisiana was captain of the Yale University sport rowing team.

Biography
He was born on January 18, 1893, in New Orleans, Louisiana. He was captain of the sport rowing team and graduated from Yale University in 1914. He served in France as first lieutenant in the Louisiana National Guard's Washington Artillery during World War I.

Denègre then attended Tulane Law School and practiced law in New Orleans. He married Alma Baldwin and had three children including Thomas Bayne Denègre, Jr. He died in June 1967 in Biloxi, Mississippi.

References

Yale University alumni
1893 births
1967 deaths
Lawyers from New Orleans
Sportspeople from New Orleans
Tulane University Law School alumni
20th-century American lawyers